Indian Overseas Bank (IOB) is a central public sector bank under the ownership of Ministry of Finance, Government of India. It is based in Chennai. It has about 3,214 domestic branches, about 4 foreign branches and representative office. Founded in February 1937 by M. Ct. M. Chidambaram Chettyar with twin objectives of specialising in foreign exchange business and overseas banking, it has created various milestones in Indian Banking Sector. During the nationalisation, IOB was one of the 14 major banks taken over by the government of India. On 5 December 2021, IOB got Degidhan Award 2020–21 by Ministry of Electronics & Information Technology for achieving second highest percentage of digital payment transaction among central government-owned-banks.

History

Pre-World War II
In 1937, M. Ct. M. Chidambaram Chettyar established the Indian Overseas Bank to encourage overseas banking and foreign exchange operations. IOB started up simultaneously at three branches, one each in Karaikudi, Madras, and Rangoon (Yangon). It quickly opened a branch in Penang, Kuala Lumpur (1937 or 1938), and another in Singapore (1937 or 1941). The bank served the Nattukottai Chettiars, who were a mercantile class that at the time had spread from Chettinad in Tamil Nadu state to Ceylon (Sri Lanka), Burma (Myanmar), Malaya, Singapore, Java, Sumatra, and Saigon. As a result, from the beginning IOB specialised in foreign exchange and overseas banking (see below). Due to the war, IOB lost its branches in Rangoon and Penang, and Singapore, though the branch in Singapore resumed operations in 1942 under Japanese supervision.

After World War II
In 1945 or 1946 IOB opened a branch in Colombo. In 1947, IOB opened a branch in Bangkok. Then IOB added a branch each in Ipoh, Klang, and Malacca, all in Malaya. Some years later, in 1955, IOB opened its first branch in Hong Kong. Others would follow.

In 1963 the revolutionary government in Burma nationalised Indian Overseas Bank's branches in Rangoon, Mandalay, and Moulmein, which became People's Bank No. 4.

In the 1960s, the banking sector in India was consolidating through the merger of weak private sector banks with stronger ones. IOB acquired a number of local banks: Coimbatore Standard Bank (acq. 1963; one branch at Madras), Nanjinnad Bank (or Nanjanad Bank), Coimbatore Vasunthara Bank (or Coimbatore Vasundara Bank; est. June 1924; Head office and three branches; acq. 1964), Kulitalai Bank (est. 1933; acq. 1964; six branches), Srinivasa Perumal Bank (est. November 1935 at Coimbatore; acq. 1966), and (Sri/Lord) Venkateswara Bank (est. June 1931 as Salem Shevapet Sri Venkateswara Bank; acq. 1967; two branches in Salem, Tamil Nadu).

Then in 1969, the Government of India nationalized IOB. At one point, probably before nationalization, IOB had twenty of its eighty branches located overseas. However, Malaysian law forbade foreign government ownership of banks in Malaysia. After nationalization Indian Overseas Bank, like all the nationalized banks, turned inward, emphasizing the opening of branches in rural India.

In 1973, IOB, Indian Bank, and United Commercial Bank established United Asian Bank Berhad in Malaysia. (Indian Bank had been operating in Malaysia since 1941 and United Commercial Bank had been operating there since 1948.) The banks set up United Asian to comply with the Banking Law in Malaysia, which prohibited foreign government banks from operating in the country. Each contributed their operations in Malaysia to the new joint-venture bank, with each of the three-parent banks owning a third of the shares. At the time, Indian Bank had three branches, and Indian Overseas Bank and United Commercial Bank had eight between them. Also, IOB and six Indian private banks established Bharat Overseas Bank as a Chennai-based private bank to take over IOB's Bangkok branch.

In 1977 IOB opened a branch in Seoul. it also opened a branch in Tsim Sha Tsui, Kowloon, Hong Kong. Two years later, IOB opened a foreign currency banking unit in Colombo, Sri Lanka.

In 1983 ethnic sectarian violence in the form of anti-Tamil riots resulted in the burning of IOB's branch in Colombo. Indian Bank, which may have had stronger ties to the Sinhalese population, escaped unscathed.

In 1988–89, IOB acquired Bank of Tamil Nadu, and its 99 branches, in a rescue. Bank of Tamil Nadu (or Bank of Tamilnad), had been established in 1903 in Tirunelveli as the South India Bank.

In 1992 Bank of Commerce (BOC), a Malaysian bank, acquired United Asian Bank (UAB).

The new millennium
In 2000, IOB engaged in an initial public offering (IPO) that brought the government's share in the bank's equity down to 75%. In 2001 IOB acquired the Mumbai-based Adarsha Janata Sahakari Bank, which gave it a branch in Mumbai. Then in 2009 IOB took over Shree Suvarna Sahakari Bank, which was founded in 1969 and had its head office in Pune. Shree Suvarna Sahakari Bank had been in administration since 2006. It had nine branches in Pune, two in Mumbai and one in Shirpur. The total employee strength was estimated to be little over 100.

IOB opened an extension counter at New Kathiresan Temple complex, Bambalapitiya, Sri Lanka, on 29 August 2003.

In 2005 IOB opened a representative office in Guangzhou, China. The next year IOB opened another representative office, this time in Kuala Lumpur. In 2009 IOB opened a Representative office in Dubai, United Arab Emirates.

In the new millennium, international expansion picked up once again. In 2007, IOB took over Bharat Overseas Bank. Then in 2009 IOB acquired Pune-based Shree Suvarna Sahakari Bank, which had been established in 1969; the bank had nine branches in Pune, two in Mumbai, and one in Shripur.

In 2010 Malaysia awarded a commercial banking license to a locally incorporated bank to be jointly owned by Bank of Baroda, Indian Overseas Bank and Andhra Bank. The new bank, India International Bank (Malaysia), commenced operations in 2012 in Kuala Lumpur, which has a large population of Indians. Andhra Bank holds a 25% stake in the joint-venture, Bank of Baroda owns 40%, and IOB the remaining 35%.

IOB opened an Offshore Banking Unit in Colombo, Sri Lanka, on 31 August 2013. The bank also upgraded its existing Extension Counter at Bambalapitiya into a full-fledged branch.

Today, Indian Overseas Bank covers a vast domain in the banking sector with over 3214 domestic branches, 3270 ATMs and 4 overseas branches.

IOB is now aggressively focussing on ‘digital banking’, with a view to doing away with all the paperwork like cheques, pay-in slips, demand drafts and so on, through its robust digital platform. Through Digital Banking, IOB wants to give its customers the luxury of freely accessing and performing all traditional banking activities 24x7 without having to personally go to a bank branch to get one’s work done. Digital Banking with IOB is possible through a laptop, tablet or one’s mobile phone. Over the last few years, Digital Banking has drastically changed the way IOB and its customers interact with each other. More and more IOB customers are today being connected to its Digital Banking platform with each passing day.

Milestones

1957 – Bank established its own training center 
1964 – Inauguration of IOB's Head Office in Mount Road.
1974 – Official Language Department established in 1974
1984 – 1000th branch opened
1991 – Bank moved its Staff College premises to an own spacious learning zone at Koyambedu
1996 – Banks profit reached INR 100 cr. for the first time i.e. USD16.69Mn [1USD=Rs. 59.9150]
2000 – Initial Public Offer. Follow on Public Offer in 2003.
-The first public sector bank to introduce anywhere banking at its 129 branches in the four metros,
is extending the connectivity to another 100 branches in Hyderabad, Bangalore, Ahmedabad and Ludhiana
-The first public sector bank in the country to introduce mobile banking services using the Wireless Application Protocol (WAP).
2005 – Launched Debit Card
2006 – Launched VISA Card, Retail Sale of Gold and Non-Life Joint Insurance Bank reached INR 1 lac crore mark in Total Business
2006 – 07 Net Profit reached INR 1000 Cr.(US$229.78 Mn) [1USD= Rs. 43.5200] Bharat Overseas Bank Ltd. Was merged with IOB and First Offsite ATM at Kamatchi Hospital, Chennai
2009 – 100% CBS
2010 – 2000th Branch -Yamuna Vihar, New Delhi-opened 
2011-12 – No. of Branches in Tamil Nadu reached 1000, and IOB celebrated Platinum Jubilee 2012–13. As on 31.3.2013, total deposits reached INR 202,135 cr. (US$37,236Mn.) [1USD =Rs. 54.2850]As on 31.3.2013, Total Advances reached INR 164,366cr. (US$30,278 Mn.) As on 31.3.2013, Total Business Mix is at INR 366,501cr. (US$67,514Mn.), Total No. of Branches 2908
2014-15 Bank has surpassed the landmark of 3000 ATMs as on 31.07.2014 – Tirumalaipatti Branch
2015 – IOB launched new Mobile Banking, m Passbook applications.
2015-IOB started migration from its in-house CBS platform to Finacle.
January 2016- All branches successfully migrated from in house CBS platform "CROWN" to FINACLE.

Joint Ventures/Tie Ups

IOB entered into Non-Life Insurance Business with Universal Sompo General Insurance (USGI) Company Limited with equity participation of 19% along with Indian Bank, Karnataka Bank, and Dabur Investments.
IOB was in tie-up with Apollo Munich Health Insurance to provide specialized health and personal accident products to its customers till May 2021.
 Now IOB is in tie up with Niva Bhupa to provide specialized health and personal accident products to its customers from June 2021.

See also
 Banking in India
 List of banks in India
 Reserve Bank of India
 Indian Financial System Code
 List of largest banks
 List of companies of India
 Make in India

References

Sources
IOB ANALYST PRESENTATION MARCH 2022 
Kumar, Ranjana (2008) A New Beginning: The Turnaround Story of Indian Bank. (Tata McGraw-Hill Education).
Turnell, Sean (2009) Fiery Dragons: Banks, Moneylenders, and Microfinance in Burma. (NAIS Press). 
NDTV https://www.ndtv.com/business/stock/indian-overseas-bank_iob/reports#:~:text=Indian%20Overseas%20Bank%20(IOB)%20was,in%20Burma%20(presently%20Myanmar%20).
Hindu Business Line https://www.thehindubusinessline.com/money-and-banking/iob-extends-1000-cr-loan-to-jkidfc/article65191093.ece
Business Standard https://www.business-standard.com/article/companies/indian-overseas-bank-software-technology-park-of-india-ink-mou-122040101411_1.html
Economic Times https://economictimes.indiatimes.com/markets/stocks/earnings/indian-overseas-bank-clocks-58-rise-in-q4-net-profit-at-rs-552-crore/articleshow/91643806.cms
Times of India https://timesofindia.indiatimes.com/business/india-business/iob-doubles-net-profit-in-fy22/articleshow/91649353.cms

Public Sector Banks in India
Banks established in 1937
Financial services companies based in Chennai
Indian companies established in 1937
Indian brands
Companies listed on the National Stock Exchange of India
Companies listed on the Bombay Stock Exchange